The Sorrows of Satan is a 1926 American silent drama film directed by D. W. Griffith, and based on the 1895 allegorical horror novel The Sorrows of Satan by Marie Corelli.

Reportedly Griffith did not want to do this project, but as his first Paramount Pictures assignment he was not given a choice. However, the film turned out to be one of Griffith's most fully realized works and its critical stock has risen considerably in the last several decades.

The film featured Carol Dempster's final screen role, although she lived until 1991.

Plot
Adolphe Menjou stars as Prince Lucio de Rimanez, who is in fact really Satan assuming a human form. When struggling writer Geoffrey Tempest (Ricardo Cortez) is moved to curse God for his misfortunes, Prince Lucio makes a sudden appearance, informing Tempest that he has inherited a fortune. The only proviso is that Tempest must place his fate entirely in the Prince's hands. As he ascends to the uppermost rungs of European society, Tempest is ordered by Lucio to marry Russian Princess Olga (Lya De Putti), even though the writer still loves his sweetheart Mavis Claire (Carol Dempster). Eventually, Prince Lucio reveals his true identity, but not before Olga has committed suicide. After rejecting the devil and all his false promises, Tempest lives happily ever after with Mavis.

Cast

Production
It was Griffith's first film for Paramount Pictures following a string of independent productions. After Griffith finished the film, it was taken out of his control and re-edited by Julian Johnson.

A version of Corelli's novel had been filmed in England in 1917, but Griffith's adaptation was closer to the novel.

This film, like The Queen of Sheba (1921) and Ben-Hur (1925), was released in a different edit in Europe due to nudity. The American version of The Sorrows of Satan had Lya de Putti's character play a nightclub scene with enough attire to pass the censors. In the European version, Griffith shot the nightclub scene with de Putti bare breasted.

Cultural influence
A still from the film was used on the cover of the 1979 song "Bela Lugosi's Dead" by the English band Bauhaus.

References

External links

 
 
 

1926 films
1920s romantic fantasy films
American silent feature films
Films based on British horror novels
Films based on works by Marie Corelli
American romantic fantasy films
Films directed by D. W. Griffith
The Devil in film
American black-and-white films
1920s American films
Films with screenplays by John Russell (screenwriter)
Films about writers
Silent horror films
1920s English-language films